Gremmeniella is a genus of fungi in the family Helotiaceae. The genus contains at least 3 species.

The genus name of Gremmeniella is in honour of J. Gremmen (fl. 1953) a Dutch botaniker (Mycology), plant pathologist, from the Forest Research
Station T.N.O. in Wageningen.

The genus was circumscribed by Michel Morele in Bull. Soc. Sci. Nat. Archéol. Toulon & Var vol.183 on page 9 in 1969.

Gremmeniella abietina is a plant pathogen that causes scleroderris canker.

Species

Gremmeniella abietina
Gremmeniella juniperina
Gremmeniella laricina
Gremmeniella pinicola
Gremmeniella baggina

References 

Helotiaceae